The Our Lady Queen Cathedral, also called New Cathedral of Bragança, is a religious building of the Catholic Church that serves as the seat of the diocese of Bragança-Miranda in northeastern Portugal.

The temple was inaugurated on October 7, 2001 as the first Portuguese cathedral built in the 21st century. It was designed by architect Rosa Vassal in a total space of 10,000 square meters.

It was consecrated to the Virgin by Bishop Antonio Rafael.

See also
Roman Catholicism in Portugal

References

Braganca New
Roman Catholic churches in Bragança, Portugal
Roman Catholic churches completed in 2001
2001 establishments in Portugal
21st-century Roman Catholic church buildings